Fusarium sterilihyphosum is a plant pathogen. It infects mango trees. Its aerial mycelium is almost white; conidiophores on aerial mycelium are erect, occasionally prostrate, and sympodially branched bearing mono- and polyphialides. Phialides on aerial conidiophores mono and polyphialidic. Sterile hyphae are present. Microconidia are obovoid, oval to allantoid, 0-septate conidia are abundant, 1-septate conidia less common. Sporodochia are seldom present. Macroconidia have slightly beaked apical cells, a footlike basal cell, 3–5 septate. Chlamydospores are absent.

References

Further reading

External links 

sterilihyphosum
Fungal tree pathogens and diseases
Mango tree diseases
Fungi described in 2002